Hippeastrum mirum is a species of herbaceous perennial bulbous flowering plants in the amaryllis family, Amaryllidaceae, subfamily Amaryllidoideae. It was formerly treated as Tocantinia mira, the only species in the monotypic genus Tocantinia.

Description 
The flowers are single, the stigma capitate. Spathe bracts are lanceolate, with a single valve.

Distribution and habitat 
Tocantinia mira grows in a dry forest between the rivers Araguaia and Tocantins.

References

Bibliography

External links 
 Tocantinia at JSTOR

Amaryllidoideae